USS Growler was a 53-ton wooden schooner of 5 guns that served in the War of 1812, changing hands three times.

The United States purchased Growler as Experiment on Lake Ontario during 1812, and was first commanded by Sailing Master M.P. Mix. She was actively employed with Isaac Chauncey's squadron on Lake Ontario from 1812 to 1814. Growler took part in attacks on Kingston, York, and Fort George, and the engagement with the British squadron 7–11 August 1813. 

The British captured her on 10 August 1813, but  recaptured her on 5 October 1813.  Growler was libelled and purchased by the United States Navy, rejoining the squadron.

The British captured her again 5 May 1814 at Oswego, New York, and she was taken into the Royal Navy as HMS Hamilton.

References

War of 1812 ships of the United Kingdom
Age of Sail sloops
War of 1812 ships of the United States
Sloops of the United States Navy
Great Lakes ships
1812 ships
Vessels captured by the United States Navy
Sloops of the Royal Navy
Vessels captured from the United States Navy